The Hasselt – Maastricht tramway (Dutch: Sneltram Hasselt - Maastricht) was a proposed fast tram system linking Hasselt, Belgian province of Limburg and Maastricht, Dutch province of Limburg. The project was part of the Spartacusplan of Belgian Limburg, proposed by the Belgian transport company De Lijn, with the aim of improving the province's transport links. The tramway's opening was originally scheduled for 2017, then postponed until 2025. It was finally cancelled on 10 June 2022 in favour of an electric "trambus".

One factor in the project's cancellation was that in order for the tram to reach Maastricht station, the Sint Servaasbrug over the Maas would have needed to be strengthened. The line would therefore have had to terminate at Maastricht Mosae Forum. 

Between the two towns, the planned tramway was to follow the course of a disused railway line. It would have improved links in a northeasterly direction between Maastricht and the southern part of the Dutch Limburg province and Antwerp, as currently the only rail service from the Dutch province to Belgium runs south to Liège-Guillemins.

Proposed tram stops
Due to the weakness of the Sint Servaasbrug, the original plan to have the line terminate at Maastricht railway station was abandoned. Below is the list of future tram stops, as planning stood in September 2020.

References

External links
 Official site of the project

Proposed public transport in Belgium
Proposed rail infrastructure in the Netherlands
Tram transport in Belgium
Light rail in the Netherlands